LepreCon is an annual science fiction convention with an emphasis on art held in and around Phoenix, Arizona usually in May around Mother's Day weekend.  It is the second oldest science fiction convention in Arizona.  It is sponsored by LepreCon, Inc., an Arizona non-profit corporation. LepreCon 43 was held July 1–4, 2017; in November, 2017, LepreCon, Inc. chose to cancel LepreCon 44 in the previously announced format as the Phoenix Sci-Fi & Fantasy Art Expo, which had been scheduled for March 2018 at the Unexpected Art Gallery.

History
The early LepreCon conventions were held around St. Patrick's Day weekend, thus giving birth to the name of the convention, a pun on leprechaun.  As the tourist season expanded in Arizona, the normal dates for the convention moved into the May time frame with an occasional foray into June.  Leprecon, Inc. is an Arizona non-profit corporation that sponsors the annual LepreCon conventions.  Leprecon, Inc. has also sponsored the 2004 World Horror Convention, the 2004 World Fantasy Convention, the 2006 Nebula Awards, the 62nd annual Westercon in 2009 (also called FiestaCon) and held the first ever North American Discworld Convention in 2009.  Because of these special events LepreCon 35 (2009) was a fan gathering, or relaxacon.  LepreCon 36 (2010) returned as a traditional LepreCon.

In 2011 at Renovation (Worldcon 2011) in Reno, NV, Leprecon Inc announced a bid to host the 2014 North American Science Fiction Convention (NASFiC) should London, UK, win their 2014 Worldcon Bid. At Chicon 7 (Worldcon 2012 in Chicago, IL) London did win their bid and Phoenix In 2014 NASFiC Bid became official (www.phoenixin2014.org). The vote for NASFiC 2014 and Worldcon 2015 will be held at Worldcon 2013 (LoneStarCon 3 in San Antonio, TX).

In 2012 Leprecon Inc decided to start a gaming convention, ConFlagration (www.conflag.org). It was held June 25–27, 2012, at Tempe Mission Palms Hotel in Tempe, Arizona. The convention broke even and the organization is debating whether to continue running them annually.

Leprecon, Inc. decided to make the convention have an emphasis on art, with the artist guest being given top billing as well as featuring a local artist guest. Starting in 2005 with LepreCon 31, the LepreCon film festival was started to provide an additional focus on filmmaking.

Leprecon Guests of Honor read like a Who's Who of science fiction and fantasy artists and authors.  Past artist guests include Frank Kelly Freas, Michael Whelan, Phil Foglio, Donato Giancola, Janny Wurts, Don Maitz, Liz Danforth, Stephen Hickman, Bob Eggleton, Larry Elmore, Alan A. Clark, Dave Dorman, Jael, Howard Tayler, Monte M Moore, Lubov, Kevin Ward, Laura Brodian Freas, Sue Dawe, Rowena Morrill, Jim Fitzpatrick, Richard Hescox, Alan Gutierrez, Kim Poor, Lela Dowling, Real Musgrave, George Barr, Alicia Austin.  Author guests have included Marion Zimmer Bradley, Roger Zelazny, Gordon R. Dickson, Ray Feist, Larry Niven, Robert Silverberg, Poul Anderson, Jack Williamson, Chelsea Quinn Yabro, Tim Powers, David Drake, and Kevin J. Anderson.

With 2020 being cancelled resulting from the COVID-19 pandemic, the 46th was deferred to 2021.

Guests of Honor

Awards and honors
In 2010, Phoenix New Times declared LepreCon "Best Sci-Fi Convention" in its annual Best of Phoenix awards.

References

External links
 The Leprecon, Inc. website
 The LepreCon 39 website
 The FiestaCon website
 The North American Discworld Convention website
 The Phoenix In 2014 NASFiC Bid website
 The 2012 ConFlagration website

1974 establishments in Arizona
Science fiction conventions in the United States
Festivals in Phoenix, Arizona
Festivals established in 1974